Jeremy Shane Guthrie (born April 8, 1979) is an American former professional baseball pitcher. He played in Major League Baseball (MLB) for the Cleveland Indians, Baltimore Orioles, Colorado Rockies, Kansas City Royals, and Washington Nationals. Prior to playing professionally, he attended Stanford University.

Guthrie was selected by the Indians in the first-round of the 2002 MLB draft. He made his MLB debut in 2004, but continued to stay in the Indians' minor-league system. In 2007, he was claimed off waivers by the Orioles, where he had a 3.70 ERA and went 7–5 across 32 starts. In 2009, he pitched for Team USA in the 2009 World Baseball Classic. 

In 2012, he was traded twice, landing on the Royals in July. He proved to be the best pitcher for the Royals in the second half of the season, posting a 3.16 ERA and a 5–3 record. In 2014, he made his only appearance in the postseason, including two starts in the 2014 World Series against the San Francisco Giants, going 1–1. After becoming a free agent at the end of the 2015 season, he signed multiple minor-league contracts before being released each time. In 2017, he signed with the Nationals and appeared in one game before being released.

Early life and education
Guthrie was born in Roseburg, Oregon and grew up in Ashland, Oregon. As a youth, he attained the rank of Eagle Scout in the Boy Scouts of America. Guthrie attended Ashland High School, where he excelled in basketball, football, baseball, as well as the classroom, where he was class valedictorian. After high school, he attended Brigham Young University before transferring to Stanford University, where he was a starting pitcher on their baseball team. At Stanford, Guthrie studied sociology; he continues to pursue his degree in the offseason.

Baseball career

Stanford
Guthrie was the ace of the Stanford University staff and formed a battery with Ryan Garko. He pitched in the regionals that season against MAAC champion Marist College in the first game and won 5–3.  Stanford reached the 2001 College World Series final in Omaha, but lost 12–1 in the Championship to the Miami Hurricanes.

Cleveland Indians
Guthrie was the first-round selection (22nd overall) of the Cleveland Indians in the 2002 MLB draft. He signed with the Indians on October 3, 2002. His four-year, $4 million contract included a $3 million signing bonus.

Guthrie made his MLB debut in 2004, pitching in six games for the Indians. In 2005, Guthrie spent the majority of the season in the minors. He appeared in one game for the Indians, pitching six innings while allowing four runs.

Guthrie spent most of the 2006 season with the Triple-A Buffalo Bisons, but was twice called up to the MLB to join the Cleveland Indians as a relief pitcher. He wore jersey number 57 for both the Bisons and the Indians. After being removed from the 40-man roster following the signing of Trot Nixon and with no remaining Minor League options, he was designated for assignment on January 19, 2007.

Baltimore Orioles
Guthrie was claimed off waivers by the Baltimore Orioles on January 29, 2007. Upon joining the team, he requested and was granted permission to wear uniform number 46 from then-executive vice president of baseball operations Mike Flanagan, who had worn it during his playing career with the ballclub. After starting the year in the Baltimore Orioles' bullpen and then moving into the starting rotation, Guthrie enjoyed a breakout year in 2007, becoming one of the best and most consistent pitchers in the American League. Through June 21 that year, he ranked second in ERA and allowed more than two earned runs in just one out of 10 starts. He was also first in the AL in WHIP.

Through the end of July 2007, Guthrie had a 7–3 record in 17 starts to go with a sparkling 2.89 ERA and a 1.027 WHIP (second only to two-time Cy Young Award winner Johan Santana) albeit only in 124.7 innings of work. Guthrie's rise to unexpected success in the first half of the season led to consideration for the American League's Rookie of the Year Award. He finished the year 7–5 with a 3.70 ERA in 32 games (26 starts).

In August 2008, Guthrie recorded his first career complete game, defeating the Seattle Mariners 3–1. Throughout the 2008 season, Guthrie emerged as the staff ace of the Baltimore Orioles. Guthrie finished the season with a 3.63 ERA, going 10–12 in 30 starts for the Orioles.

Guthrie pitched for Team USA in the 2009 World Baseball Classic. Guthrie pitched on Opening Day for the Orioles against the New York Yankees, with 48,607 people in attendance at Camden Yards. Guthrie pitched six innings and gave up three runs in that game. The 2009 season wasn't Guthrie's best, as his ERA ballooned to 5.04 while leading the league in losses with 17.

Guthrie rebounded in 2010, winning a career-high 11 games despite losing 14 and lowering his ERA to 3.83 in 32 starts. In 2011, he pitched for over 200 innings for the third straight season in 2011 while also leading the league in losses for the second time in his career with 17.

Colorado Rockies

On February 6, 2012, Guthrie was traded to the Colorado Rockies for pitchers Matt Lindstrom and Jason Hammel.

Guthrie battled through inconsistency and a mental lapse while pitching in Coors Field, registering an ERA over 8 at home for the Rockies. In 19 games (15 starts), Guthrie had an ERA of 6.35. His record was 3–9 in his short stay with Colorado.

Kansas City Royals
On July 20, 2012, Guthrie was traded to the Kansas City Royals for left-handed starter Jonathan Sánchez. He proved to be the Royals' best pitcher in the second half of the season, posting a record of 5–3 with a 3.16 ERA in 14 starts. On November 20, Guthrie inked a three-year, $25 million deal with the Royals through 2015. Guthrie earned $5 million in 2013, $11 million in 2014, and $9 million in the contract's final year.

He finished with a 15–12 record and a 4.04 ERA in 33 starts. During the 2014 season Guthrie posted a 4.13 ERA over 202.2 innings and finished the regular season with a record of 13–11. He also appeared in the postseason for the first time in his career. In Game 3 of the ALCS against his former team, the Baltimore Orioles, he allowed one run over five innings and got a no decision in the Royals victory. He made two starts in the 2014 World Series against the San Francisco Giants, going 1–1.

On May 25, 2015, Guthrie had the worst start of his career, and one of the worst starts in MLB history, against the New York Yankees. Guthrie gave up nine hits, 11 earned runs, and three walks. Thirteen of the 16 batters he faced reached base, and he recorded just three outs before being pulled. Guthrie was the first pitcher since Jae Kuk Ryu in 2006 to give up four home runs while pitching fewer than two innings. On August 22, the Royals demoted Guthrie to the bullpen to make room in the rotation for Kris Medlen. Guthrie finished 8–8 with an ERA of 5.95 in 30 games (24 starts). He walked 44 batters and struck out just 84 in  innings pitched.

Texas Rangers
On February 20, 2016, Guthrie signed a minor league deal with the Texas Rangers. He was released on March 28.

San Diego Padres
On April 1, 2016, Guthrie signed a minor league contract with the San Diego Padres. He was released on June 3, 2016.

Miami Marlins
Guthrie and the Marlins agreed to a minor league contract on June 27, 2016. After he struggled at the AAA level and the Marlins acquired starting pitching depth, the Marlins released Guthrie from his minor league deal on July 31, 2016.

Melbourne Aces
On December 5, 2016, Guthrie signed with the Melbourne Aces of the Australian Baseball League.

Washington Nationals
On February 3, 2017, Guthrie signed a minor league deal with the Washington Nationals and received an invitation to spring training. Although he began the 2017 season in the minor leagues despite an impressive showing in spring camp, he was called up on April 8, 2017, to start against the Philadelphia Phillies at Citizens Bank Park. Making his first start with the Nationals on his 38th birthday, Guthrie struggled immensely as he was removed from the game after getting only two outs in the first inning. He allowed 10 runs, and the Nationals lost 17–3. As in 2015, he had one of the worst starts in MLB history. After his outing, his ERA for the year was 135.00. The next day, the Nationals designated Guthrie for assignment and called up Matt Albers.

Acereros de Monclova
On May 18, 2017, Guthrie signed with the Acereros de Monclova of the Mexican Baseball League. He was released on June 2, 2017. He announced his retirement from the MLB on July 31, 2017.

Eastern Reyes del Tigre
In July 2020, Guthrie came out of retirement to pitch for the Eastern Reyes del Tigre of the Constellation Energy League (a makeshift 4-team independent league created as a result of the COVID-19 pandemic).

Personal life
Guthrie is a member of the Church of Jesus Christ of Latter-day Saints (LDS Church) and he served for two years as a missionary for the church in Spain.  He lives in Portland, Oregon, with his wife, Jenny and they are the parents of three children.

As announced by the LDS Church on February 1, 2018, Guthrie began a three-year assignment as president of its Texas Houston South Mission in July 2018.

Guthrie was born to a Japanese American mother from Hawaii. He is a yonsei or fourth generation Japanese American, but does not speak Japanese.

References

External links

1979 births
Living people
Acereros de Monclova players
Águilas Cibaeñas players
American expatriate baseball players in the Dominican Republic
Akron Aeros players
All-American college baseball players
American baseball players of Japanese descent
American expatriate baseball players in Mexico
Latter Day Saints from Oregon
American Mormon missionaries in Spain
Baltimore Orioles players
Baseball players from Oregon
BYU Cougars baseball players
Buffalo Bisons (minor league) players
Cleveland Indians players
Colorado Rockies players
Kansas City Royals players
Major League Baseball pitchers
Mexican League baseball pitchers
Melbourne Aces players
Modesto Nuts players
Sportspeople from Ashland, Oregon
Sportspeople from Roseburg, Oregon
Stanford Cardinal baseball players
Washington Nationals players
World Baseball Classic players of the United States
2009 World Baseball Classic players
American expatriate baseball players in Australia